Federal Highway 16 (Fed. 16) is a free part of the federal highways corridors of Mexico.

Fed. 16 runs west-east through the northern Sierra Madre Occidental cordillera.

|-
|Son.
|313.60
|194.86
|-
|Chih.
|564.80
|350.95
|-
|Total
|878.40
|545.81
|}

Major intersections

Western terminus at  Fed. 15 in Hermosillo, Sonora
 Fed. 24 in Nuevo Palomas, Chihuahua
 Fed. 45 in Chihuahua City
Eastern terminus at  US 67 on Presidio–Ojinaga International Bridge between Ojinaga and Presidio, Texas

References

016
1016
1016
1016